The James Norris Memorial Trophy, or simply the Norris Trophy, is awarded annually to the National Hockey League's top "defense player who demonstrates throughout the season the greatest all-round ability in the position". It is named after James E. Norris, the longtime owner of the Detroit Red Wings. The James Norris Memorial Trophy has been awarded 61 times to 26 players since its beginnings in 1953–54. At the end of each season, members of the Professional Hockey Writers' Association vote to determine the player who was the best defenseman during the regular season.

History
The trophy is named in honour of James E. Norris, owner of the National Hockey League's Detroit Red Wings from 1932 to 1952. The trophy was first awarded at the conclusion of the 1953–54 NHL season.

Bobby Orr of the Boston Bruins won the award for a record eight consecutive seasons (1968–75). Doug Harvey and Nicklas Lidstrom won the award seven times, and Ray Bourque won it five times; Bourque was in the top three vote-getters for the trophy a further ten times. The Boston Bruins have had the most Norris Trophies winners with 14; the Montreal Canadiens have had the second most with 12.

Only two players have won both the Norris and Hart Memorial Trophy for the league Most Valuable Player in the same season: Bobby Orr, who won both trophies in the 1969–70, 1970–71 and 1971–72 seasons, and Chris Pronger, who won the Hart and Norris in the 1999–2000 NHL season. As of 2021, no defenseman has won the Hart Trophy without also winning the Norris Trophy since the latter was introduced.

Six defensemen won the Hart Trophy as the league's most valuable player before the Norris Trophy's establishment: Herb Gardiner, Eddie Shore (four times), Albert "Babe" Siebert, Ebbie Goodfellow, Tommy Anderson and Babe Pratt.

Save for Randy Carlyle, every Norris winner eligible to be inducted into the Hockey Hall of Fame has been.

Members of the Professional Hockey Writers' Association vote at the end of the regular season, and each individual voter ranks their top five candidates on a 10–7–5–3–1 point(s) system. Three finalists are named and the trophy is awarded at the NHL awards ceremony after the conclusion of the playoffs.

Winners

See also
List of National Hockey League awards
List of NHL players
List of NHL statistical leaders

References
General
James Norris Memorial Trophy at NHL.com
James Norris Memorial Trophy history at Legends of Hockey.net

Specific

National Hockey League trophies and awards
Awards established in 1954